Glack is a hamlet and townland in County Londonderry, Northern Ireland. It is 4 km south of Ballykelly, in a raised spot overlooking Lough Foyle. In the 2001 Census it had a population of 183 people. It is situated within Causeway Coast and Glens district.

Glack is made up of three clusters of buildings. It has a primary school (St Finlough's, in neighbouring Sistrakeel townland) and a business called Paragon Health Ltd.

It has a Gaelic club called Glack GAC, a Community Association and numerous other clubs to include camogie, bowling and knitting clubs.

History

Sport
Glack has its own bowling team called St Finlough's.
Glack GAC is the local Gaelic Athletic Association club

References 

Villages in County Londonderry
Causeway Coast and Glens district